Sandra Riley Tang (born 25 December 1990), known mononymously as RRILEY, is a Singaporean artist and musician who made her debut into the industry in 2012 as a founding member of local pop quartet The Sam Willows.

Career
As part of The Sam Willows, she has performed at numerous festivals and events around the globe including the SXSW Festival in Texas, Ultra Singapore, Summer Sonic in Japan, We The Fest in Jakarta and Hyper Play Singapore 2018. The Sam Willows have also obtained multiple GOLD and PLATINUM certifications for their previous 2 albums, and in 2019, they were featured in Forbes’ 30 Under 30 Asia list, which showcases young and influential disruptors, innovators and entrepreneurs in Asia.

Sandra has established herself as one of Singapore’s most influential personalities. She has co-hosted on Michael Bolton’s reality show “Bolt of Talent” in August 2017, which aired on Fox Live Asia and even performed a duet with the award-winning singer at his concert that same year. In 2018, she paired with Canadian pop artist Daniel Powter, to perform a duet for the Singapore President’s Star Charity.

In 2019, she released her debut solo single "Burn" as RRILEY, which has since taken over the airwaves and flaunts a considerable amount of the singer’s various musical influences, while also offering an ample first glimpse into her capabilities as a solo artist. The track has garnered over 1 million streams online since its release.

She released a second single "mmm bye" in August 2019. The track speaks about calling out and moving on from the people that don’t serve you anymore. Exploring themes of self-doubt and the pressure of ideas and identities being thrust upon you. The track is a captivating earworm with potent rhythms and endlessly catchy hooks that seeks to cement RRILEY’s place in the pop pantheon.

In 2020, she released a new single in March titled "Love Me Like A" as an unconventional love song. On August, she released her debut EP, "Alpha", which includes a track with Zamaera called "Fire".

Personal life
Apart from her musical endeavours, Sandra has expanded her talents into other areas of expertise. On 2015, The singer co-founded local yoga studio "The Yoga Collective" and pursued Evolve MMA in the form of Brazilian Jiujitsu, earning herself a blue belt in 2018. She also explored directing, having helmed the director’s chair for projects like her band The Sam Willows’ music video for the single ‘Keep Me Jealous’ (which has gone on to win numerous awards since its release) and co-directing 'Burn' music video.

Filmography

Movies

Discography

Singles

References

External links

Living people
1990 births
Singaporean actresses
Singaporean jazz musicians
21st-century Singaporean women singers
Singaporean pop singers
Singaporean singer-songwriters
Singaporean Hokkien pop singers
Jazz guitarists
Jazz pianists
Jazz fusion musicians
Jazz bandleaders
Women jazz musicians
21st-century guitarists
21st-century Singaporean actresses
Women bass guitarists
Jazz bass guitarists
Free jazz musicians
21st-century bass guitarists
The Sam Willows members
21st-century women guitarists
21st-century women pianists